Shëngjergj (Albanian for Saint George) is a village and a former municipality in the Tirana County, central Albania. At the 2015 local government reform it became a subdivision of the municipality Tirana. The population at the 2011 census was 2,186.

Demographic history
Shëngjergj appears in the Ottoman defter of 1467 as a settlement in the timar of the Muslim convert Yusuf, belonging to the wider region of Tamadhea in the vilayet of Çermeniça. The village had a total of 12 households which were represented by the following household heads: Ishri Somruni, Mihal Uraji (possibly, Vraji), Petër Mirali, Nikolla Goranzi, Petër Pirati, Nikolla Korriku, Mekshe Lleshi (possibly, Leshi), Andrije Uraji, Shar Bogdani, Gjon Bureshi, Ilia Qinami, and Petër Gurabardi.

References

Former municipalities in Tirana County
Administrative units of Tirana
Villages in Tirana County